A list of Portuguese films that were first released in 2010.

See also
2010 in Portugal

References

2010
Lists of 2010 films by country or language
2010 in Portugal